Aliprando Caprioli was an Italian engraver, born in Trento and active in Rome between 1575 and 1599, producing portraits and historical subjects in the style of Agostino Carracci and Cornelis Cort.

References

Italian engravers
People from Trento
Year of death unknown
Year of birth unknown